Shamator District is the 16th district of the Indian state of Nagaland. It was created on 19 January 2022 and was officially inaugurated on 4 March 2022. The district headquarter is located in the town of Shamator.

History 
Shamator District was created on 19 January 2022 as the 16th district of Nagaland. The new district has the same boundaries as the former Shamator sub-division of Tuensang District, Chessore Sub-division including Mangko EAC Circle, Administrative area of Sotokur EAC Circle excluding Chingmelen, Helipong and Sipongsang villages, Tsurungto EAC Circle under Shamator sub-division, including Hutanger, Anatongre, Pungrungru, Nutsu, Maihpok and Tsuthu, under Kiphire district, which stand transferred to Tsurungto EAC circle.

Demographics 
According to the 2011 census of India the then Shamator circle of Tuensang District had a population of 12,726. Shamator circle had a sex ratio of 988 females per 1000 males and a literacy rate of 66.25%. Scheduled Tribes make up 99.03% of the population. The majority of the inhabitants are the Tikhir and Yimkhiung Nagas.

Towns and villages 
 Chassir (601), Lasikiur (242), Liangkonger (785), Muleangkiur (887), Sangphur (2,314), Shamator Hq (4,257), Shamator Village (1,159), Waphur (996), Yakor (1,078).

Religion 

Christianity is the major religion here, with 98.88% of the population.

Language 
At the time of the 2011 census, 90.44% of the population spoke Yimchungre and 7.85% Tikhir as their first language.

Transportation

Road 
The NH 202  passes through the district.

See also 
 Nagaland

References 

Districts of Nagaland
2022 establishments in India